Crackley is an estate in the Borough of Newcastle-under-Lyme, Staffordshire. It is a former National Coal Board estate and lies on the edge of the larger village of Chesterton.

References 

Borough of Newcastle-under-Lyme